James Alexander Devlin (June 6, 1849 – October 10, 1883) was an American Major League Baseball player who played mainly as a first baseman early in his career, then as a pitcher in the latter part.  He played for three teams during his five-year career; the Philadelphia White Stockings and the Chicago White Stockings of the National Association, and the Louisville Grays of the National League.  However, after admitting to throwing games and costing the Grays the pennant in the 1877 Louisville Grays scandal, he and three of his teammates were banished permanently from Major League Baseball.

Career
Jim Devlin began his career in the first organized professional league, the National Association, as an infielder for his hometown Philadelphia White Stockings team in 1873, and the Chicago White Stockings in the 1874 and 1875 seasons. In 1876, the National Association folded and was replaced by the National League that lives on to this day.  In this year, Devlin began pitching for the Louisville Grays, starting 68 games with an impeccable 1.56 earned run average and leading the Grays in batting with .315.  His best pitch was a "drop pitch", now known as a sinker, which Devlin may have been the first to throw.  In 1877, Devlin, the only pitcher on the roster, threw every pitch of his team's 61 games, the only pitcher ever to do so.

Banishment
Led by Devlin and slugger George Hall, the Grays opened up a four-game lead in the NL pennant race by mid-August. However, the Grays suffered a horrendous road trip and endured a seven-game losing streak, which was characterized by uncharacteristic "bonehead" plays and poor pitching. The Grays relinquished their lead and eventually finished second, seven games behind the Boston Red Caps (who tore up the league afterwards, winning 20 of 21 games to end the season). Meanwhile, certain Grays were seen around town wearing fancy new jewelry and ostentatiously dining at exclusive restaurants.

At the end of the season, suspicion arose that players were being paid to intentionally lose games. This suspicion increased as the players performed very well in post-season exhibition matches and as the Louisville Courier-Journal discovered that utility infielder Al Nichols had received an abnormally high number of telegrams. Courier-Journal writer John Haldeman, who was the son of the team president and sometimes played second base in the team's exhibition games, was the first to publicly accuse the Grays of throwing games. Team vice president Charles Chase, who had earlier received but disregarded telegrams informing him that gamblers were betting against the Grays in certain games, began an investigation. Devlin and Hall confessed, and Chase demanded that his players allow him to inspect their telegrams.  The telegrams confirmed that Nichols was coordinating the games with New York gamblers. Bill Craver, the team's shortstop, who was the only player to deny the request, citing lack of pay, and who carried a bad reputation from his days in the National Association, was presumed guilty by association and was suspended.

William Hulbert, the president of the National League, decided to make a stand against gambling. He immediately banned Devlin, Hall, Nichols, and Craver for life. Craver, against whom no evidence of gambling has ever been found, was outraged and appealed the suspension. Devlin also appealed to the League for reinstatement every year for the rest of his life. However, Hulbert remained resolute and none of the Louisville Four ever played major league baseball again (according to legend, Devlin literally begged, on his knees, for another chance; Hulbert responded by giving Devlin a fifty-dollar bill; "This is what I think of you personally, Jim", the league president supposedly said, "[b]ut, damn you, you have thrown a game, you are dishonest, and this National League will not stand for it!"). Devlin, who found work in Philadelphia as a police officer, died poor of tuberculosis in 1883 and was survived by a wife and son. He is interred at New Cathedral Cemetery in Philadelphia.

See also

List of Major League Baseball annual strikeout leaders
List of Major League Baseball career ERA leaders
List of people banned from Major League Baseball

References

External links

1849 births
1883 deaths
19th-century baseball players
19th-century deaths from tuberculosis
Major League Baseball controversies
Major League Baseball pitchers
Philadelphia White Stockings players
Chicago White Stockings players
Louisville Grays players
National League strikeout champions
San Francisco Athletics players
Baseball players from Philadelphia
Sportspeople banned for life
Philadelphia Police Department officers
Tuberculosis deaths in Pennsylvania
Watertown Athletics players